Mala Plana may refer to:

Croatia 
 , a village in the town of Gospić, Lika-Senj County

Serbia 
 Mala Plana (Smederevska Palanka), a village in the municipality of Prokuplje, Podunavlje District
 Mala Plana (Prokuplje), a village in the municipality of Prokuplje, Toplica District

See also 
 Velika Plana (disambiguation)